Geshe Kelsang Gyatso (19 July 1931 – 17 September 2022) was a Buddhist monk, meditation teacher, scholar, and author. He was the founder and spiritual director of the New Kadampa Tradition-International Kadampa Buddhist Union (NKT-IKBU), a registered non-profit, modern Buddhist organization that came out of the Gelugpa school/lineage. 1,300 centres around the world, including temples, city temples and retreat centres offer an accessible approach to ancient wisdom.

Life and education in Tibet
Kelsang Gyatso was born in 1931 on the 4th day of the 6th month of the Tibetan lunar calendar, in Yangcho Tang, Western Tibet and named Lobsang Chuponpa. At eight years old, he joined Ngamring Jampa Ling Monastery where he was ordained as a novice monk and given the monastic name "Kelsang Gyatso" meaning "Ocean of Good Fortune".{{refn|group=nb|In November 1986, Kelsang Gyatso oversaw the rebuilding of Ngamring Jampa Ling Monastery after its destruction, and it was fully restored and reopened by September 1988.<ref>'Full Moon Magazine 1991</ref>}} He "went on to study at Sera, one of the great monasteries of Tibet’s dominant Gelug school. He was trained in the traditional method of intense scholastic study and debate, and he studied for a geshe degree, an advanced distinction in Buddhist scholarship."

Leaving Tibet and life in India

After escaping to India via Nepal during the Tibetan exodus in 1959, Kelsang Gyatso stayed at the monastic study centre established at Buxa Fort in West Bengal, India.  All he brought with him were two Buddhist scriptures — Shantideva's Guide to the Bodhisattva's Way of Life and a text by Je Tsongkhapa. In 1971, the Indian Government donated large tracts of land in South India to the community in exile, where separate monasteries were established. At this time, Kelsang Gyatso left the monastery at Buxa for Mussoorie (a hill station in the Indian state of Uttarakhand) where he taught and engaged in intensive meditation retreat for sixteen years.  At that time Kelsang Gyatso was, as David Kay puts it, "by all accounts, a very well respected scholar and meditator" within the Tibetan exile community. He spent much of his time in India in retreat: "over the next two decades he spent long periods in retreat in the Himalayan foothills."

Journey to the West
In 1976, at the suggestion of the Dalai Lama, Kelsang Gyatso was invited by Lama Thubten Yeshe through their mutual spiritual guide Trijang Rinpoche to become the resident teacher at the main FPMT center, Manjushri Institute in Ulverston, Cumbria in England. In 1991, following a three-year retreat in Tharpaland, Dumfries, he founded the NKT-IKBU . He retired as General Spiritual Director of the NKT-IKBU in August 2009 but continued to write books and practice materials.

Lama Yeshe's decision to invite his former classmate to be Resident Teacher at the FPMT's Manjushri Institute in England was advised by the Dalai Lama. He arrived in August 1977 and gave his first teaching on Lamrim on September 10.

Under Kelsang Gyatso's spiritual direction, Manjushri Institute "became a thriving training and retreat center." Kelsang Gyatso taught the General Program at Manjushri from 1977 to 1987. At that time, the Geshe studies programme was taught by Jampa Tekchok and then Konchog Tsewang (1982–1990). (In 1990 the Geshe Studies Programme at Manjushri Institute was cancelled, as it had been in most of the other FPMT Centres where it had been established.)

On October 13, 1983, Kelsang Gyatso became a naturalized British citizen.

Establishing Buddhist centres

In 1979, Kelsang Gyatso opened a Buddhist teaching centre  (Madhyamaka Centre in Yorkshire) under the spiritual direction of his teacher H.E. Trijang Rinpoche. Geshe Kelsang Gyatso was give permission to update the presentation of the dharma (teachings of Buddhism) to be clear and accessible to western students.

In 1987, Kelsang Gyatso entered a 3-year retreat at Tharpaland International Retreat Centre in Dumfries, Scotland. During his retreat, he wrote five books and established the foundations of the NKT-IKBU.  After completing his retreat in the early months of 1991, Kelsang Gyatso announced the creation of the NKT-IKBU, an event which was celebrated by his students in the NKT-IKBU magazine Full Moon as "a wonderful development in the history of the Buddhadharma." Since that time, the NKT-IKBU has grown to comprise 1,300 centres worldwide, most principally study and meditation centers, some principally retreat centers, and six traditional-style Temples for World Peace.

Kelsang Gyatso's teachings have a practical emphasis on teachings based on Lamrim, Lojong and Mahamudra.

Waterhouse commented that, "He teaches in English with a strong Tibetan accent. He is an endearing character to look at; petite with slightly downcast eyes which look about him as he walks or teaches his devoted students." Spanswick observes that, "many of those who hear him speak are struck by his wisdom and sincerity."

At the heart of the NKT-IKBU are its three study programs: the General Program, the Foundation Program, and the Teacher Training Program.

According to the NKT-IKBU, it "seeks not to offer a westernized form of Buddhism, but rather to make traditional Gelugpa Buddhism accessible to westerners." To achieve this, Kelsang Gyatso taught himself English.

Books

Kelsang taught extensively on all aspects of Buddha's Sutras and Tantras in light of the teachings and tradition of Je Tsongkhapa. He was also a prolific writer and translator. His books present various key aspects of Buddhism as taught by the Gelug scholastic tradition. Several have been well regarded and recommended by senior Gelug Lamas. 
Kelsang Gyatso's books were first published by Wisdom Publications. In 1985, Tharpa Publications was founded, to publish his teachings and since then has been the exclusive publisher of his works worldwide.

With an aim to provide Western Dharma practitioners with essential Buddhist texts, Kelsang published 22 books.  His first book published in 1980 was a commentary to Shantideva's Guide to the Bodhisattva's Way of Life called Meaningful to Behold. This was followed by Clear Light of Bliss in 1982.

A number of Kelsang Gyatso's textbooks have received favourable reviews. Bluck writes that "The three most popular works—Introduction to Buddhism, The New Meditation Handbook and Transform Your Life—have sold 165,000 copies between them, showing their appeal far beyond the movement itself." Batchelor says that Kelsang Gyatso's books are written with "considerable clarity." Braizer echoes this sentiment, saying that Kelsang Gyatso writes "excellent" books that are "an important contribution to Western understanding of Buddhism and its traditions. They can stand on their own merit." Guide to Dakini Land and Essence of Vajrayana have been described as "the most detailed and revealing commentary on specific tantric practices yet to be published in a Western language." In his book review of Guide to Dakini Land, Richard Guard said:

Over a million copies of Kelsang Gyatso's books have been sold. His books include titles for beginners such as Introduction to Buddhism, Transform Your Life and How to Solve Our Human Problems, books about the Mahayana path like Universal Compassion (Lojong), The New Heart of Wisdom (Heart Sutra) and Joyful Path of Good Fortune (Lamrim), and books on Vajrayana (Tantra) like Mahamudra Tantra, Guide to Dakini Land and Essence of Vajrayana. Two of his books are commentaries on Indian Mahayana texts: the book Ocean of Nectar is a commentary to Chandrakirti's Guide to the Middle Way, and Meaningful to Behold is a commentary to Shantideva's Guide to the Bodhisattva's Way of Life or Bodhicharyavatara.

Kelsang Gyatso also translated and/or composed many sadhanas, or prayer booklets, for the practice of many of the Buddhist Tantras.

Emphasis on lineage
Kay says that NKT-IKBU practitioners practice their tradition exclusively, "eschewing eclecticism." Kelsang Gyatso's "conservative and traditional presentation of Buddhism" is appealing to Westerners who "wish for a meaningful alternative to spiritual pluralism."  According to Kelsang Gyatso in Understanding the Mind:

Therefore, Kelsang Gyatso taught in Great Treasury of Merit that the most effective way to progress spiritually is by "following one tradition purely — relying upon one Teacher, practising only his teachings, and following his Dharma Protector. If we mix traditions many obstacles arise and it takes a long time for us to attain realizations."

Geshe Kelsang was known as an exponent of Dorje Shugden practices, which brought him into conflict with the Tibetan political establishment."

Ordination of Westerners
The new Kadampa tradition provides a modern supportive environment for those who sincerely wish to take their devotion to Buddhism deeper by becoming ordained.  Whereas in the former Tibetan traditions, women, for example were not permitted to take ordination vows. [Citation needed]

Development of Western Dharma teachers
Kelsang Gyatso founded the New Kadampa Tradition "to bring pure Buddhist teachings to the west," where he would train equally four types of teacher: monks, nuns, lay men and lay women. NKT-IKBU Dharma Centres are mixed communities of lay and ordained practitioners who are all on the same teaching programs. He also promoted the development of local teachers in their own language. This is a departure from most Tibetan Buddhist Centres where monastics take precedence over lay people, monks take precedence over nuns, and Tibetans take precedence over Westerners.

In a teaching called Training as a Qualified Dharma Teacher, Kelsang Gyatso explained where the teachers of the NKT-IKBU come from:

Retirement
In August 2009, he voluntarily stepped down as General Spiritual Director of the NKT-IKBU, in a democratic system of succession that he established in the NKT-IKBU's "Internal Rules".

Kelsang Gyatso engaged in meditation retreat and continued to write Dharma books to preserve and promote the Kadampa Buddhism of Je Tsongkhapa, in accordance with the instructions of Trijang Rinpoche. According to Richard Spanswick, "Since taking up residence at Conishead Priory, Kelsang has been working to produce a complete set of instructions for westerners wishing to set out on the path to enlightenment." Continuing this task, a new book entitled Modern Buddhism: The Path of Wisdom and Compassion was released in January 2010, and its oral transmission was given by Kelsang Gyatso at the Fall 2010 NKT-IKBU Festival.

Kelsang Gyatso did not made any public appearances between October 2013 and his death in September 2022. The NKT stated he was "in strict retreat".

Death
On 19 September 2022, the NKT announced the death of Venerable Geshe Kelsang Gyatso Rinpoche via their website and social media. 
Their statement reads:

The community of Kechara Forest Retreat and visiting sangha from Shar Gaden, Serpom, Phelgyeling and Segyu monasteries offered a Lama Chopa puja and many candle offerings dedicated for Ven. Geshe-la’s swift return: "Having established the New Kadampa Tradition, Ven. Geshe Kelsang Gyatso was the spiritual father to tens of thousands around the world. A true Kadampa master, Geshe-la dedicated his entire life to upholding the pure traditions of Je Tsongkhapa and Dorje Shugden, and his contribution to the lineage was unparalleled in recent times."

BibliographyThe Bodhisattva Vow: A Practical Guide to Helping Others, Tharpa Publications (2nd. ed., 1995) Buddhism in the Tibetan Tradition: A Guide, Routledge & Kegan Paul (1984) , (Library Edition 2008) Clear Light of Bliss: Tantric Meditation Manual, Tharpa Publications (2nd. ed., 1992) Eight Steps to Happiness: The Buddhist Way of Loving Kindness, Tharpa Publications (2000) Essence of Vajrayana: The Highest Yoga Tantra Practice of Heruka Body Mandala, Tharpa Publications (1997) Great Treasury of Merit: How to Rely Upon a Spiritual Guide, Tharpa Publications (1992) Guide to Dakini Land: The Highest Yoga Tantra Practice of Buddha Vajrayogini, Tharpa Publications (2nd. ed., 1996) Guide to the Bodhisattva's Way of Life: How to Enjoy a Life of Great Meaning and Altruism, a translation of Shantideva's Bodhisattvacharyavatara with Neil Elliott, Tharpa Publications (2002) Heart Jewel: The Essential Practices of Kadampa Buddhism, Tharpa Publications (2nd. ed., 1997) The New Heart of Wisdom: Profound Teachings from Buddha's Heart, Tharpa Publications (5th. ed., 2012) How to Solve Our Human Problems: The Four Noble Truths, Tharpa Publications (2005, US ed., 2007) Introduction to Buddhism: An Explanation of the Buddhist Way of Life, Tharpa Publications (2nd. ed., 2001, US ed. 2008) Joyful Path of Good Fortune: The Complete Buddhist Path to Enlightenment, Tharpa Publications (2nd. ed., 1995) Living Meaningfully, Dying Joyfully: The Profound Practice of Transference of Consciousness, Tharpa Publications (1999) Mahamudra Tantra: The Supreme Heart Jewel Nectar, Tharpa Publications (2005) Meaningful to Behold: The Bodhisattva's Way of Life, Tharpa Publications (5th. ed., 2008) The Mirror of Dharma: How to Find the Real Meaning of Human Life, Tharpa Publications (2018)Modern Buddhism: The Path of Wisdom and Compassion, Tharpa Publications (2010)  The New Meditation Handbook: Meditations to Make Our Life Happy and Meaningful, Tharpa Publications (2003) Ocean of Nectar: The True Nature of All Things, Tharpa Publications (1995) The Oral Instructions of the Mahamudra, Tharpa Publications (2015) Tantric Grounds and Paths: How to Enter, Progress on, and Complete the Vajrayana Path, Tharpa Publications (1994) Transform Your Life: A Blissful Journey, Tharpa Publications (2001, US ed. 2007) Understanding the Mind: The Nature and Power of the Mind, Tharpa Publications (2nd. ed., 1997) Universal Compassion: Inspiring Solutions for Difficult Times, Tharpa Publications (4th. ed., 2002) 

Notes

References

Further reading
  - (A review of Ocean of Nectar: Wisdom and Compassion in Mahāyāna Buddhism'' by Geshe Kelsang Gyatso).

External links

 NKT-IKBU official website
 Tharpa Publications — The publisher of Geshe Kelsang Gyatso's books
 Modern Buddhism The Path of Compassion and Wisdom — Free eBook by Geshe Kelsang Gyatso
 New Kadampa Truth — Responding to criticism of Geshe Kelsang Gyatso
 New Kadampa Truths Writing and discussion critical of the New Kadampa movement by ex-members. There is a similarly named "New Kadampa Truth" with response to this criticism.

1931 births
2022 deaths
Dorje Shugden controversy
Founders of new religious movements
Gelug Buddhists
Geshes
New Kadampa Tradition
New Kadampa Tradition lamas
Lamas
Politics of Tibet
Tibetan Buddhists from Tibet
Tibetan Buddhism writers